Miss Europe 1997 was the 52nd edition of the Miss Europe pageant and the 41st edition under the Mondial Events Organization. It was held at the Ukraina Palace of Culture in Kyiv, Ukraine on September 6, 1997. Isabelle Darras of Greece, was crowned Miss Europe 1997 by out going titleholder Marie-Claire Harrison of England.

Results

Placements

Special awards

Contestants 

 - Angelina Babajanyan
 - Anna Dierekh
 - Annelor Van den Bossche
 - Madlena Kalinova
 - Natalija Bedekovic
 - Paraskevi Efstathiou
 - Kristina Fridvalská
 - Natalya Barkova
 -  Delphine Brossard-Martinez
 - Nino Tskitishvili
 - Isabelle Darras
 - Leonie Maria Boon
 - Klaudia Angelika Toth
 - Alexandra Schwartztokh
 - Flavia Mantovan 
 - Inga Kruma
 - Eva Bzezinska
 - Sonja Closener
 - Aleksandra Petko Petrovska
 - Michelle Buttigieg
 - Agnieszka Zielinska
 - Lara Antunes
 - Daciana Honcvic
 - Alexandra Valeryievna Petrova
 - Monika Sulikova
 - Natasa Smirnov
 - Patricia Jañez Rodríguez 
 - Nilay Ceylan
 - Nataliya Nadtochey

Notes

Withdrawals
The following countries withdrew after their designated delegate quit the competition due to threats of their safety, and poor food and accommodations. They later complained foreign diplomats about their concerns:
 - Mette Ravn Ibsen
 - Emma Scott
 - Taija Jurmu
 - Agathe Neuner
 - Harpa Lind Hardardóttir
 - Michelle Murphy
 - Anne Mette Tveiten
 - Jessica Johansson
 - Yara Lederberger
 - Kate Ann Peyton

Other withdrawals:
 - no delegate sent

Debuts

Returns

References

External links 
 

Miss Europe
1997 beauty pageants
1997 in Ukraine
1990s in Kyiv
Events in Kyiv